The 2022–23 Boise State Broncos men's basketball team represented Boise State University in the Mountain West Conference during the 2022–23 NCAA Division I men's basketball season. Led by thirteenth-year head coach Leon Rice, the Broncos played their home games on campus at ExtraMile Arena in Boise, Idaho.

Boise State finished the regular season at 23–8 (13–5 in Mountain West, second). In the conference tournament, they defeated UNLV in the quarterfinals, then lost to Utah State in the semifinals. The Broncos received an at-large bid to the NCAA tournament and were seeded tenth in the West region; they were defeated by seventh seed Northwestern in the first round at Sacramento and finished at 24–10.

Previous season
The Broncos finished the 2021–22 season at 27–8 (15–3 in Mountain West, first) to finish as regular season champions, and  defeated Nevada, Wyoming, and San Diego State to win the conference tournament. They received the automatic bid to the NCAA tournament as the eighth seed in the West region, but lost in the first round to Memphis.

Offseason

Departures

Incoming transfers

Recruiting classes

2022 recruiting class

2023 recruiting class

Roster

Schedule and results

|- 
!colspan=9 style=| Exhibition

|- 
!colspan=9 style=| Non-conference regular season

|- 
!colspan=9 style=| Mountain West regular season

|-
!colspan=9 style=| Mountain West tournament

|-
!colspan=12 style=| NCAA Tournament

Source

Rankings

*AP does not release post-NCAA tournament rankings^Coaches did not release a Week 1 poll.

References

Boise State Broncos men's basketball seasons
Boise State
Boise
Boise State